Charles Junior Elliott (December 30, 1921 – September 16, 1980) was an American football tackle. He played college football for Oregon and professional football for the New York Yankees, Chicago Rockets, and San Francisco 49ers.

Early years
Elliott was born in 1921 in Corvallis, Oregon, he attended Corvallis High School where he was a star athlete in both track and football. He set an Oregon high school record in the shot put.

College football
Elliott attended the University of Oregon, where he was a member for the college football and track teams. 

In August 1943, Elliott entered in the U.S. Army Air Forces during World War II. He was sent overseas in mid-June 1944 and was wounded later that year while serving in the European Theater. He was hospitalized in Belgium after his injury.

Professional football
Elliott was selected by the Los Angeles Rams in the 22nd round (203rd overall pick) of the 1947 NFL Draft. He opted instead to play in the All-America Football Conference (AAFC) for the New York Yankees in 1947 and for the Chicago Rockets and San Francisco 49ers in 1949.

Later years
After retiring as a player, Elliott was hired in 1949 as the football coach at Oregon City High School. David died in 1980 at age 58 in Oregon City, Oregon.

References

1921 births
1980 deaths
New York Yankees (AAFC) players
Chicago Rockets players
San Francisco 49ers players
Oregon Ducks football players
Players of American football from Oregon
Sportspeople from Corvallis, Oregon
United States Army Air Forces personnel of World War II